Eric Nagler (born June 1, 1942 in Brooklyn, New York) is an American musician and television personality known primarily for his work on Canadian children's television series such as The Elephant Show and Eric's World.

Biography 

Initially, Nagler was a folk musician in the United States, and in 1966 he marched through Mississippi with Martin Luther King Jr., encouraging people to register to vote. He married fellow musician Martha Beers in 1966. Due to their conscientious objection to the Vietnam War, the couple moved to Toronto in 1968 in order to “avoid” the draft. In 1972, Nagler returned to the United States to stand trial for draft evasion; he was acquitted. Around 1971, Eric and Martha owned a guitar/folk-music store on Avenue Road in Toronto called the Toronto Folklore Centre. The couple divorced in 1977. Since 1991 Nagler has lived with his partner Diana Buckley in the hills of Mulmur, near Shelburne, an hour north of Toronto, Ontario, and home of the Annual Canadian Championship Fiddling Contest.

In 1991–1996, he had a children's TV show called Eric's World, which aired on the Canadian provincial networks (TVOntario, Knowledge Network, SCN, and Access) and Family Channel.

Instruments 

Nagler plays a variety of instruments, often homemade or improvised, in the skiffle style.

Awards and recognition
1982: Award for Excellence, American Library Association for the album Fiddle Up a Tune
1986: nomination, Juno Award for Best Children's Album, Come On In
1990: nomination, Juno Award for Best Children's Album, Improvise with Eric Nagler
1994: nomination, Juno Award for Best Children's Album, Can't Sit Down
1995: nomination, Juno Award for Best Children's Album, Eric's World Record

Discography
This is a partial listing:
1971: contributed to High Winds, White Sky by Bruce Cockburn
1973: The Gentleness in Living (Swallowtail)
1977: A Right and Proper Dwelling (Philo)
1982: Fiddle Up a Tune (Elephant) (producer Paul Mills)
1985: Come On In (Elephant) (producer Paul Mills)
1989: Improvise with Eric Nagler (Oak Street/Rounder)
1992: Can't Sit Down
1994: Eric's World Record

Filmography
 1984–1989: The Elephant Show
 1990–1995: Eric's World

Bibliography
1989: Eric Nagler makes music, co-writer Diana Buckley (McGraw-Hill Ryerson)

References

External links

 Come On In!, review of disc

1942 births
Living people
Activists from Toronto
American expatriate musicians in Canada
American anti–Vietnam War activists
Canadian children's musicians
Canadian children's television presenters
Musicians from Brooklyn
Musicians from Toronto
American emigrants to Canada
Vietnam War draft evaders